Scholte was a railway stop in the province of Groningen in the Netherlands. It was situated on the Harlingen–Nieuweschans railway between the railway stations of Sappemeer Oost and Zuidbroek. It was in service for the employees of the company Scholten between 1933 and 1935.

References 

Defunct railway stations in Groningen (province)
Railway stations closed in 1935
Railway stations on the Staatslijn B
Railway stations opened in 1933
Transport in Midden-Groningen